The Crédit Industriel et Commercial (CIC, "Industrial and Commercial Credit Company") is a bank and financial services group in France, founded in 1859. It has been majority owned by Crédit Mutuel, one of the country's top five banking groups, since 1998, and fully owned since 2017.

History

Creation and independent development

The new bank was initially located in a hotel at 57, rue Taitbout, and in January 1860 purchased a mansion at 66, rue de la Chaussée d'Antin, in whose garden it erected a commercial building (no longer extant) that was completed in November 1861. That facility was accessible from No. 72, rue de la Victoire, and the CIC would remain known as the "bank of the rue de la Victoire" even that street has no longer been its registered address since 1993. 

The CIC soon opened a number of other branches in Paris, and in the 1860s actively developed its international lending, not least in the newly formed Kingdom of Italy. In France outside Paris, unlike the Crédit Lyonnais (est. 1863) and Société Générale (est. 1864) which created networks of their own provincial branches, the CIC sponsored a number of affiliated but autonomous regional banks. These initial achievements were fragile, however, not least because the CIC held no equity shares in the allied banks. The Crédit du Nord escaped the CIC’s influence as early as the 1870s, and so did the SMC in the early 20th century. 

In the late 1860s, the CIC lent to the Suez Canal Company and to the Pereire brothers' Compagnie Générale Transatlantique. After the Franco-Prussian War of 1870-1871, the CIC was increasingly associated with conservative and reactionary political factions. It was instrumental in the creation in 1875 of the Banque de l'Indochine, in partnership with the Comptoir d'escompte de Paris. In 1881, it founded the National Bank of Haiti, which took the role of Haiti's central bank by concession from that country's government while remaining headquartered in Paris.

In Paris, in its first few decades the CIC's network of branches lagged well behind those of its two main rivals, Crédit Lyonnais and Société Générale. Outside the capital, the CIC kept its strategy of fostering the creation or build-up of regional banks. The bank in Saint-Étienne, however, failed and was liquidated in 1883. 

In November 1889, the bank's head office was relocated to a new building on 66, rue de la Victoire, where it would remain for over a century. In August 1895, the CIC also opened a branch in London, at 126, Cannon Street. In the 1890s and 1900s, it greatly expanded its branch network in the capital region, which in 1913 reached 42 inside Paris and 6 in the surroundings. 

At the start of World War I, the head office was temporarily relocated to Bordeaux, but returned to the capital in November 1914. Also in November 1919, it took a 25% stake in the Banque Dupont in Valenciennes (est. 1819), and in 1920 a 33% stake in the Banque Scalbert in Lille (est. 1838). The CIC further developed this strategy of stake-building when financial stress hit several regional banks in subsequent years. By then, it was the fifth-largest French bank by assets, behind the Crédit Lyonnais, Société Générale, Comptoir national d'escompte de Paris, and Banque Nationale de Crédit.

In April-May 1941, the CIC took advantage of the īto acquire control of Banque Transatlantique together with two subsidiaries, Banque de Tunisie and Banque Commerciale du Maroc (the latter merged into Attijariwafa Bank in the early 2000s). After the Liberation of France, its larger rivals were nationalized, and as a consequence the CIC became France's largest private-sector bank in the postwar period. In June 1967, it ceded its branches in Algiers and Oran to the Bank of Algeria. The group's first logo was adopted in 1967.

Takeover by Suez and nationalization

 
From 1965 to 1971, the CIC was at the center of a major takeover battle. In the sum of 1968, the situation escalated into a takeover battle on the Paris stock exchange, following which neither Paribas nor Suez succeeded in acquiring a majority of the CIC's shares. Suez, however, kept a hands-off approach and did not include the CIC in the 1975 merger that created Banque Indosuez. 

Meanwhile, like many other European banks, from the late 1960s the CIC accelerated its international development. It opened an office in Frankfurt in 1969, followed by others in Latin America, Beirut, Tokyo, Hong Kong, Sydney, and Milan. In 1974, it opened a branch in New York, its second only after the one in London. By 1977, it had 21 representative offices abroad. In 1979, the CIC acquired a 25% stake in the Banque Nagelmackers in Belgium.

In 1982, the CIC was nationalized under François Mitterrand's Socialist presidency, together with most of the affiliated regional banks and with its parent, the Suez Company. This triggered significant restructuring. The CIC then created a subsidiary, CIC-Paris, which took over the Parisian banking activity as well as Banque Transatlantique and the stakes in foreign banks. Then, in 1985 the government encouraged the insurer  (GAN) to build up a stake in CIC, which reached 34% in January 1986. Meanwhile, CIC was recapitalized by the state in 1983 and in 1985. In 1989, the GAN raised its stake to 56%, then 82% in 1991 and 92.6% in 1995, an unusual case of a major banking group owned by an insurance company. In 1993, the CIC-Paris moved across street from its longstanding head office at 66, rue de la Victoire, which it had sold in late 1989, to a renovated complex of buildings between the rue de la Victoire, rue Taitbout, and rue de Provence, known as the "VTP building" for the three streets' initials, including the former head office of Société Générale at 76, rue de la Victoire.

Privatization and integration into the Crédit Mutuel Group

Following the election of a center-right government in 1993, the political pendulum shifted back towards privatization of the CIC and its parent the GAN insurance company, but this was made difficult by both entities' financial difficulties through the downturn of the early 1990s. A first attempt in August 1996, to sell a 67% stake in the CIC holding company, foundered in mid-November, triggering the resignations of the chairmen of both UE-CIC and GAN, in a context of internal opposition to the sale process from both the CIC staff and the more profitable regional banks, including CIAL, BSD, SNVB and CIO. 

The new management from Crédit Mutuel further central control over the group's regional banks, and in 1999 the UE-CIC and CIC-Paris merged back into a single entity called CIC. In September 2001, Crédit Mutuel completed its takeover of CIC by acquiring the GAN's residual 23% stake, and CIC was eventually delisted in August 2017. In July 2001, CIC had acquired full ownership of the Banque Transatlantique through a delisting, and in 2002 acquired full ownership of Banque de Luxembourg, in which CIAL had been a major shareholder since 1969, by purchasing Deutsche Bank's 29% stake. 

In the 2000s the CIC further streamlined its regional network and phased out its historic brands. In 2006, CIO and BRO merged to form , renamed  in 2010; BSD and CIN (plus the small ) merged to form , renamed  in 2010; and CIAL and SNVB merged in 2007 to form . CIC developed international partnerships, in Italy with Banca Popolare di Milano in 2004, in Tunisia through an increase to 20% of its stake in Banque de Tunisie in 2002, and in Morocco by taking a 10% stake in BMCE Bank, which was later increased. In 2022, CIC encountered international controversy when a New York Times article highlighted its siphoning of millions of Francs in fees and interest from Haiti’s treasury in the late 19th and early 20th centuries.

Leadership

For most of its history since 1890, the CIC has had separate individuals holding the respective roles of chair and chief executive ( or ). On several occasion, the chief executive later became chair. The two offices have been merged in 1978-1982 and again since 2011.

Chairs

  (1859-1878)
 Henri Durrieu (1878-1886)
 Joseph Gay (1886-1894)
  (1894-1927)
  (1927-1930)
 Henri Thélier (1930-1936)
 Joseph Deschamp (1936-1952)
 Edmond Lebée (1952-1968)
 Christian Chaix de Lavarène (1968-1978)
 Dominique Chatillon (1978-1982)
 Georges Dumas (1982-1986)
 Jean Dromer (1986-1987)
  (1987-1989)
  (1989-1992)
 Jean-Pierre Aubert (1992-1996)
 Bernard Yoncourt (1996)
 Philippe Pontet (1996-1998)
 Étienne Pflimlin (1998-2010)
  (2011-2014)
  (2014-present)

Chief executives
 Marcel de Saint-Quentin (1890-1894)
 Paul Desvaux (1894?-1907)
  (1907-1921)
 Joseph Deschamp (1921-1931)
 Edmond Lebée (1931-1936)
 Charles Roth le Gentil (1936-1940)
 Charles Dangelzer (1936-1960)
 Christian Chaix de Lavarène (1961-1968)
 Jean Roquerbe (1968-1972)
 Jean-Pierre Fourcade (1972-1974)
 Dominique Chatillon (1974-1982)
 Christian Giacomotto (1982-1988)
 Gilles Guitton (1988-1998)
  (1998-2014)
  (2014-present)

Operations

As of 2006, CIC  had 1,890 branches and over 24,000 employees serving over 3.6 million customers. As of 2011, the company offers savings accounts, mortgages, and loans; it also owns stakes in specialized entities involved in private banking, asset management, leasing, securities brokerage, and property/casualty insurance.

Controversies

Check processing fees

In 2010 the French government's Autorité de la concurrence (the department in charge of regulating competition) fined eleven banks, including CIC, the sum of 384,900,000 Euros for colluding to charge unjustified fees on check processing, especially for extra fees charged during the transition from paper check transfer to "Exchanges Check-Image" electronic transfer.

National Bank of Haiti

In 1881, CIC set up the National Bank of Haiti to serve central banking functions to the country, by concession from the Haiti government. A subsidiary of CIC, the National Bank had effective control of the Treasury of Haiti, controlling all receipt of public revenues and giving advances to fund the government. The National Bank, using practices sharply criticized e.g. by Haiti statesman Frédéric Marcelin, paid the shareholders of CIC with dividends collected from incomes and taxes collected from ordinary Haitian people and goods like sugar and coffee produced by Haitian farmers, with returns as high as 37% in 1888 and 20.3% in 1900.

A New York Times investigation in 2022, as a part of a broader report about Haiti, suggested that half of the taxes on Haiti’s coffee crop, by far its most important source of revenue, went to French investors at CIC and the National Bank. The pattern of exploitation was part of a larger context of French banking forays into Caribbean countries, in which CIC participated alongside other French institutions. Successive Haitian governments collaborated with The National Bank: for example with the help of the Domingue government a loan arrangement was made  for 50 million Francs, for which the initial payment of the ~15 million was made in March of 1875, against the 7 million received by Haiti's Treasury at the time. Currency manipulation was observed because the Haitian Government asked the National Bank to print money to cover the deficits of the payments made to institutions like the CIC. 

In 1896, the CIC also successfully managed to secure a second loan of 50,000,000 francs, at 6% interest. Over three decades, French shareholders made profits of at least $136 million in today’s dollars from Haiti’s national bank — about an entire year’s worth of the country’s tax revenues at the time, the documents show. By "effectively choking off the nation’s primary source of income", the CIC "left a crippling legacy of financial extraction and dashed hopes — even by the standards of a nation with a long history of both." The French government sought to distance itself from the CIC because of the criticism of some of the methods used, and the whole scheme came to an end in 1910.

References

External links

  Official website
  English site for people moving to France

Industriel et Commercial Credit
Banks established in 1859
Privatized companies of France
Companies based in Paris
French brands
French companies established in 1859
Crédit Mutuel